PLL may refer to:

Politics 
 Independent Political Labour League, a New Zealand labour party that originated as the Political Labour League
 Partido Liberal Libertario, an Argentine political party

Sports 

 Premier Lacrosse League, a lacrosse league in the United States started in 2019.
 Professional Lacrosse League, a former lacrosse developmental league in the United States.

Art and Entertainment 

 Pretty Little Liars (book series), a series of young adult novels by Sara Shepard
 Pretty Little Liars, a 2010 TV series based on the novels

Science and Technology 

 Phase-locked loop, a type of electronic circuit and control system
 Polylysine, a chemical substance
 Posterior longitudinal ligament, a spinal ligament

Places 

 Ponta Pelada Airport, now a military airbase in Manaus, Brazil (IATA code PLL)

Other 

 Permutation of Last Layer, a step in solving a Rubik's Cube in the CFOP method

See also

 
 
 
 PL (disambiguation)
 PL2 (disambiguation)